Robert Randall Thomas (born August 7, 1952) is a former justice of the Supreme Court of Illinois and a former professional football player. He has served as the Illinois Supreme Court Justice for the Second District since December 4, 2000, and as chief justice from September 6, 2005 to September 5, 2008. His political affiliation is Republican.

Early life and education
Born in Rochester, New York, Thomas graduated from McQuaid Jesuit High School in Rochester, where he excelled both academically and in athletics, lettering in both football and soccer.

He attended the University of Notre Dame where he kicked for the football team, including kicking the winning field goal in the 1973 Sugar Bowl victory over University of Alabama, which clinched the AP National Championship that season for Notre Dame.  He received his Bachelor of Arts degree in Government in 1974 and was named an Academic All-American in that same year.

He received his Juris Doctor degree from Loyola University Chicago School of Law in 1981.

Athletic career
Thomas had a twelve-year career as a kicker in the National Football League.

He played for the Chicago Bears (– and –), the Detroit Lions (1982), the San Diego Chargers, and the New York Giants.

Legal career
He was elected circuit court judge in DuPage County in 1988. There, he presided over civil jury trials and was the Acting Chief Judge from 1989 to 1994. In 1994, Judge Thomas was elected to the Illinois Appellate Court, Second District. On December 4, 2000, Justice Thomas was sworn in as the Illinois Supreme Court Justice for the Second District after defeating incumbent S. Louis Rathje in a contentious primary. Justice Thomas was elected to serve as Illinois Supreme Court Chief Justice on September 6, 2005, and served as the Chief Justice until September 5, 2008. In February 2020, he announced he would be resigned from the Supreme Court effective February 29.

Ruling on Rahm Emanuel ballot eligibility
On January 1, 2011, Justice Thomas authored the Illinois State Supreme Court decision Maksym v. Chicago Board of Elections that overturned a lower court ruling that Rahm Emanuel was ineligible to run for Mayor of Chicago.

Honors and awards
In April 1996, Thomas was inducted into the Academic All-American Hall of Fame. In January 1999, he received the NCAA Silver Anniversary Award.

Justice Thomas is a member of the DuPage County Bar Association.

Defamation of character lawsuit
In 2007, Justice Thomas was awarded $7 million in a successful defamation of character lawsuit against Bill Page, a former columnist at the Kane County Chronicle.  Thomas' lawyers alleged that Page had essentially accused him of official misconduct, a felony. Page wrote in his column that Thomas had traded his vote on a disciplinary case in exchange for political support for his favored candidate in a local judicial race.  The case was significant because it prompted an Illinois appellate court to establish a judicial privilege in Illinois, allowing judicial deliberations to be kept private, much like doctor-patient discussions.

Later in 2007, after the newspaper filed suit against Thomas in federal court, the parties came together and settled all litigation, with the newspaper agreeing to pay Thomas $3 million.

References

External links
 

1952 births
Living people
American athlete-politicians
American football placekickers
Chicago Bears players
Detroit Lions players
New York Giants players
Notre Dame Fighting Irish football players
San Diego Chargers players
Players of American football from New York (state)
Chief Justices of the Illinois Supreme Court
Illinois Republicans
Illinois state court judges
Justices of the Illinois Supreme Court
Judges of the Illinois Appellate Court
Loyola University Chicago School of Law alumni
Sportspeople from Rochester, New York
21st-century American judges